Prof Hans Pettersson FRSFor HFRSE RSAS  (1888–1966) was a 20th century Swedish physicist and oceanographer.<ref>Sveriges dödbok 1947-2006, (CD-ROM), Sveriges Släktforskarförbund</ref>

Early life
Hans Pettersson was born in Forshalla near Gothenburg on 26 August 1888, the son of the chemist and oceanographer Otto Pettersson (1848-1941). 
Hans Pettersson studied Sciences at Uppsala University, graduating in 1909.

He then studied atomic physics as a postgraduate at the Institute for Radium Research, Vienna.

Career
Pettersson's first publication from 1910 was on the issue of radium.

In 1913 he joined the staff of the Swedish Hydrographic-Biologocal Commission. In 1914 he began lecturing in Oceanography at Gothenburg University.

He later brought this knowledge to the field of oceanography, and with the help of radium he could determine the age of sediment samples from the bottom of the sea. Pettersson became the first full professor of oceanography in Sweden and in 1938 founded the Institute of Oceanography in Gothenburg, thanks to funding from the Knut and Alice Wallenberg Foundation. Pettersson was its head until 1956. He also was the head of the Bornö Hydrographic Field Station on Stora Bornö.

In 1956, aged 68, he became Professor of Geophysics at the University of Hawaii.

Pettersson also wrote many popular scientific texts which helped disseminate progress in oceanography to the general audience. In July 1947, the Albatross expedition started its around the world voyage with Pettersson as leader of the expedition. This expedition was planned by him, and was financed by private sponsors.

He died in Gothenburg on 25 January 1966.

PublicationsWestward Ho with the Albatross'' (1953)

Awards and honours
1947 elected an Honorary Fellow of the Royal Society of Edinburgh.
1948 elected as a member of the Royal Swedish Academy of Sciences. 
1949 Awarded the Patron's Medal of the Royal Geographical Society.
1956 elected a Foreign Member of the Royal Society of London (ForMemRS) in 1956.

References

Swedish oceanographers
Academic staff of the University of Gothenburg
Members of the Royal Swedish Academy of Sciences
1888 births
1966 deaths
Swedish physicists
Foreign Members of the Royal Society